Eldora is an uninhabited place in Volusia County, Florida, United States. It is located within Canaveral National Seashore, south of Bethune Beach and west of County Road A1A. The average elevation is 3 feet above sea level.

History
Eldora was a community of orange groves in the latter part of the 19th century. After a freeze destroyed most of its crops, it was nearly completely abandoned and has never regained its population.

After the death of its last resident, Doris "Doc" Leeper in 2000, a locally famous artist and conservationist in the 1980s, the management of the town was officially turned over to the federal government, and the town is now located more than two miles within the borders of the Canaveral National Seashore. The town claims no permanent residents, and visitation is limited and subject to park hours. Only two of its original buildings remain. The largest, "The Eldora House", now holds a museum. Although the town's orange groves were nearly completely wiped out over one hundred years ago, some trees still remain.

The town is also the site of two marine research facilities jointly shared by Daytona State College and the University of Central Florida.

Geography
The town's location is remote, as it is only accessible by one service road, County Road A1A. It is nearly a thirty-minute drive to the mainland through New Smyrna Beach.

See also
County Road A1A

References

Former populated places in Volusia County, Florida
Ghost towns in Florida